Ian Ross (born April 8, 1968 in McCreary, Manitoba), the son of Grace and Raymond Ross, is a Métis-Canadian playwright.

Life 
Ross earned a Bachelor of Arts degree with a major in film and a minor in theatre from the University of Manitoba in 1992. He spent the first five years of his life in the Métis community of Kinosota, Manitoba before moving to Winnipeg, which he currently now calls his home. Ross has written for theatre, film, television and radio, and has been writing plays for a number of years but is perhaps best known as the creator of Farewel. FareWel is Ross’ first professional production, which later won him the 1997 Governor General's Award for English Drama, making Ross the first Métis to win the award.
Ross is also the author of a number of plays which include: The Gap, Heart of a Distant Tribe, Bic Off!, Bereav'd of Light, An Illustrated History of the Anishinabe, and a children's play called, Baloney!  Ross' plays have been produced by the Manitoba Theatre for Young People, Black Hole Theatre Company, and the Winnipeg Fringe Theatre Festival. Ross has written many segments for CBC, but is well known for his humorous segment on the radio as "Joe from Winnipeg". After "Joe from Winnipeg" aired, episodes were later published in two books, The Book of Joe and Joe from Winnipeg.
 
FareWel, is fictional comedy about a group of First Nations that are forced to take control of their own lives, when their chief leaves to gamble in Las Vegas. As the Reserve is declaring self-government and the people are no longer receiving their welfare cheques, a new chief is elected by manipulation. The text was published by Scirocco 1997, and the play premiered at Prairie Theatre Exchange (PTE) in 1996, and was remounted at PTE in 1998. FareWel was later invited to the Edinburgh Fringe Festival in 2001.

The Gap is a play that portrays a love relationship between an Aboriginal man and a French woman set against the backdrop of a flood and premiered at Prairie Theatre Exchange in 2001.

An Illustrated History of the Anishinabe, is a three-person play that started in Winnipeg for only eight days of school performances. The play uses a healthy amount of comedy to tell the story of First Nations history on the Prairies. Anishinabe is a word the prairie Ojibwa people used to describe themselves.

Plays
Don't Eat Any Red Snow
CDED
Canadian Steel
King of Saturday Night
Zombies
Residue of Pain
fareWel
Asamikawin-- ("fareWel" in Cree translation)
Heart of a Distant Tribe
The Gap
Towaw -- ("The Gap" in Cree translation)
Bereav’d of Light
Bic Off!
An Illustrated History of the Anishinabe
Baloney!
Fabric of the Sky
Doubtful House

Awards
Winner, James Buller Award, 1999.
Winner, fareWel, Governor General's Award for Drama, 1997.
Winner, John Hirsch Award for Most Promising Manitoba Writer, 1996.

References

1968 births
Living people
21st-century Canadian dramatists and playwrights
Canadian people of Scottish descent
Métis writers
Governor General's Award-winning dramatists
Canadian male dramatists and playwrights
21st-century Canadian male writers